Saint-Marcel is a station of the Paris Métro, serving line 5 located in the 13th arrondissement of Paris.

Location
The station is located under the Boulevard de l'Hôpital, south of the intersection of Rue des Wallons. This is the second last underground station before the end of the southern section of the line. The station serves the Pitié-Salpêtrière Hospital.

History

The station was opened on 2 June 1906 with the commissioning of the first section of line 5 between Gare d'Orléans (now Gare d'Austerlitz) and Place d'Italie. It owes its name to its proximity to the beginning of Boulevard Saint-Marcel, named for a 5th-century bishop of Paris, who died in 436 and was famous for his miracles. He rescued Paris from a monstrous dragon, changed the water of the Seine into wine, and converted the pagans.

In 2018, 2,286,932 travelers entered this station which placed it at 240th position of the metro stations for its attendance.

Passenger services

Access
The station has two accesses consisting of fixed stairs opening on either side of the boulevard de l'Hôpital:
 Access 1 - Boulevard de l'Hôpital - La Pitié-Salpêtrière, adorned with a Guimard edicule, now a historic monument decreed on 12 February 2016, is on the right of the No. 83, which is one of the entrances to the Pitié-Salpêtrière Hospital;
 Access 2 - Rue des Wallons, embellished with a mast with a yellow M in a circle, located opposite No. 50 on the boulevard.

Station layout

Platforms
Saint-Marcel metro station is of a standard configuration. It has two platforms separated by metro tracks and the roof is elliptical. The decor is the style used for the majority of metro stations. The lighting strips are white and rounded in the Gaudin style of the metro revival of the 2000s, and the white ceramic tiles bevelled on the sides, the tympans and the outlets of the corridors. The vault is coated and painted white. The advertising frames are white ceramic and the name of the station is written in the Parisine type font on enamelled plates. The platforms are equipped with wooden slat benches.

Bus connections
The station is served by Lines 57 and 91 of the RATP Bus Network and, at night, by the N31 line of the Noctilien network.

Nearby
 Jardin des plantes
 Grand Mosque of Paris
 Pitié-Salpêtrière Hospital
 Campus Pitié-Salpêtrière

Culture
One of the station's entrances is visible in a scene in the first moments of Claude Autant-Lara's film The Traversée de Paris.

References

Paris Métro stations in the 13th arrondissement of Paris
Railway stations in France opened in 1906